Walter Henry Judd or I-te Chou (September 25, 1898 – February 13, 1994; his Chinese name is 周以德), was an American politician and physician, best known for his battle in Congress (1943–63) to define the conservative position on China as all-out support for the Nationalists under Chiang Kai-shek and opposition to the Communists under Mao Zedong. After the Nationalists fled to Formosa (Taiwan) in 1949, Judd redoubled his support.

Education and early career
Judd was born in Rising City, Nebraska, the son of Mary Elizabeth (Greenslit) and Horace Hunter Judd. After training with the ROTC for the United States Army near the end of World War I, he earned his M.D. degree at the University of Nebraska in 1923. Next, he became the Traveling Secretary for the Student Volunteer Movement.

From 1925 through 1931, Judd was a medical missionary in China, sent to assist Edward Bliss. He worked first in small clinic a backwater town, then became head of a large hospital in a sizable city.

From 1931 to 1934 he worked at the Mayo Clinic in Rochester, Minnesota.

Then, in 1934 he returned to China as a missionary physician until 1938, when he returned to Minnesota.

Political career and US foreign policy positions
Upon his return the United States, he did not urge Americans to be isolationists. Instead, Judd encouraged support of China against Japanese aggression.

Elected to the U.S. Congress from Minnesota in 1942, where he became a powerful voice in support of China. He served for 20 years from 1943 until 1963 in the 78th, 79th, 80th, 81st, 82nd, 83rd, 84th, 85th, 86th, and 87th congresses. Judd voted in favor of the Civil Rights Acts of 1957 and 1960, as well as the 24th Amendment to the U.S. Constitution.

Judd was known for his eloquent oratory and expertise in U.S. foreign policy. He spoke at civic and political gatherings around the nation. He was a good friend of Senator Harry S Truman, and together they spent two weeks in 1943 making speeches in support of the United Nations, doubling up in hotel rooms at night.   In Congress, Judd supported liberal international program such as the Truman Doctrine, the Marshall Plan, and NATO. He called for removal of ethnic and racial restrictions in the immigration laws. He was an outspoken anti-communist and critic of U.S. rapprochement with China at the expense of the Republic of China on Taiwan. In the early 1950s, Judd helped organize the Committee of One Million, a citizens' group dedicated to keeping the People's Republic of China out of the United Nations.

Judd gave the keynote address at the 1960 Republican National Convention, which met in Chicago to nominate the Nixon-Lodge ticket.
In 1962, Judd was defeated for reelection by liberal Democrat Donald M. Fraser. The District had been redrawn after the 1960 census, making it heavily Democratic. Judd's defeat worked to increase Passman's power on the foreign aid subcommittee. He was the last person to attempt to run for president on a major party ticket to have been born in the 19th century, though he did not make it past the primaries. In 1964, Judd's name was placed in nomination at the Republican National Convention for President and he received a smattering of votes.

According to biographer Yanli Gao:

Presidential Medal of Freedom
In 1981, he received the Presidential Medal of Freedom (the nation's highest civilian award). Throughout the 1970s and 1980s, he was actively involved in the Council Against Communist Aggression in Washington D.C.

Walter Judd Freedom Award 
The Fund for American Studies, an educational and internship program that works in partnership with George Mason University annually presents the Walter Judd Freedom Award in cooperation with the Center for International Relations to recognize individuals who have advanced the cause of freedom in the United States and abroad. Past recipients have included former United States President Ronald Reagan, Jack Kemp, Jeane Kirkpatrick, and George J. Viksnins, Emeritus Professor at Georgetown University.

Death
Walter Judd died of cancer in Mitchellville, Maryland, on February 13, 1994.  He is buried with his wife, Miriam, at Blue Valley Cemetery in Surprise, Nebraska.

References

Further reading
 
 Frohnen, Bruce, ed. American Conservatism: An Encyclopedia (2006) pp. 459–60.
 
 Goodno, Floyd Russell. "Walter H. Judd: Spokesman for China in the United States House of Representatives." (MA thesis. Oklahoma State University, 1970.) online
 Ladd, Tony. "Mission to Capitol Hill: A Study of the Impact of Missionary Idealism on the Congressional Career of Walter H. Judd." in United States Attitudes and Policies Toward China: The Impact of American Missionaries (1990): 263-283. online
 Yanli, Gao. "Judd's China: a missionary congressman and US-China policy," Journal of Modern Chinese History, December 2008, Vol. 2 Issue 2, pp. 197–219
 Yanli, Gao, and Robert Osburn Jr. "Walter Judd and the Sino-Japanese War: Christian Missionary cum Foreign Policy Activist." Journal of Church and State 58.4 (2015): 615-632.

External links 

 
 Background
 Publications
 Congress info
 The  Papers of Walter Judd are available for research use at the Minnesota Historical Society.
 Oral History Interview, Truman Library 
 The Walter Henry Judd Papers, 1922–1988 at the Hoover Institution Archives.
 The Lee Edwards papers at the Hoover Institution Archives contains information and oral histories about Judd.

|-

1898 births
1994 deaths
20th-century American politicians
American Congregationalist missionaries
American Congregationalists
American expatriates in China
American military personnel of World War I
Physicians of the Mayo Clinic
Physicians from Minnesota
Physicians from Nebraska
Christian medical missionaries
Congregationalist missionaries in China
Military personnel from Nebraska
People from Butler County, Nebraska
People from Hennepin County, Minnesota
Presidential Medal of Freedom recipients
Republican Party members of the United States House of Representatives from Minnesota
United States Army officers
Candidates in the 1964 United States presidential election
University of Nebraska–Lincoln alumni
American anti-communists
Conservatism in the United States
Military personnel from Minnesota